Anne Katherine Montminy (born January 28, 1975) is a Canadian former competitive diver and lawyer.

Diving career 
Montminy had a number of highpoints in her diving career; she won a gold medal on the 10m platform at 1994 Commonwealth Games and the 1995 Pan American Games.

She competed in the 1992 and 1996 Summer Olympics (in Barcelona and Atlanta), but did not advance to the finals. Four years later in 2000 at age 25, she won silver (10 m platform synchro) and bronze (10 m platform) in Sydney, Australia.

Montminy was inducted into the Canadian Olympic Hall of Fame in 2005. During her diving career, she trained at Pointe-Claire Diving Club in Pointe-Claire, Quebec.

Professional career 
Born in Montreal, Quebec, Montminy studied law parallel to her diving career, obtaining an LL.B. from the Université de Montréal in 1999, and an LL.M. from the New York University School of Law in 2002. She has since practised law at Davies Ward Phillips & Vineberg in Montreal, Clifford Chance LLP in San Francisco and at Howard Rice Nemerovski Canady Falk & Rabkin in San Francisco. She is a member of the California Bar.

In May 2008, Montminy did commentary for the CBC Television Network at the 2008 Beijing Olympics covering diving competitions.

Personal life
In 2002, she married attorney Daniel Goldman, member of the Haas family that owns Levi Strauss & Co.; they divorced in 2004.

References

External links
 
 
 
 

1975 births
Living people
Canadian female divers
Canadian women lawyers
Canadian expatriates in the United States
American women lawyers
California lawyers
Commonwealth Games bronze medallists for Canada
Commonwealth Games gold medallists for Canada
Commonwealth Games medallists in diving
Divers at the 1992 Summer Olympics
Divers at the 1994 Commonwealth Games
Divers at the 1995 Pan American Games
Divers at the 1996 Summer Olympics
Divers at the 1998 Commonwealth Games
Divers at the 2000 Summer Olympics
Divers from Montreal
Haas family
Lawyers in Quebec
New York University School of Law alumni
Medalists at the 2000 Summer Olympics
Olympic bronze medalists for Canada
Olympic divers of Canada
Olympic medalists in diving
Olympic silver medalists for Canada
Pan American Games gold medalists for Canada
Pan American Games medalists in diving
Universiade gold medalists for Canada
Universiade medalists in diving
Université de Montréal alumni
Medalists at the 1999 Summer Universiade
Medalists at the 1995 Pan American Games
20th-century Canadian women
Medallists at the 1994 Commonwealth Games
Medallists at the 1998 Commonwealth Games